Jan Dubčanský of Zdenín (1490–1543) was a Moravian nobleman, printer of the first Czech language book in Moravia, and founder of the Zwinglian but pacifist Habrovany Brethren, later led by Matěj Poustevník.

References

1490 births
1543 deaths
Protestant Reformers
Czech religious leaders
Bohemian nobility
16th-century Bohemian people